Ideachi Kalpana is a 2010 Indian Marathi-language comedy film directed and produced by Sachin Pilgaonkar and written by Kshitij Zarapkar. The film stars Sachin Pilgaonkar in a triple role alongside Ashok Saraf, Mahesh Kothare, Bhargavi Chirmule and Nirmiti Sawant.

Plot 

Jairam Gangavane (Sachin Pilgaonkar) is an upcoming struggling actor who is attracted to his co-actress Preeti (Bhargavi Chirmule), the younger sister of Commissioner Mahesh Thakur (Mahesh Kothare). Jairam's older sister Jaywanti (Nirmiti Sawant) is an astrologer who believes that is destinied for success. Jaywanti's husband Advocate Manohar Barshinge (Ashok Saraf) is a fraud lawyer who prefers out of court settlements. The story begins when Jairam accidentally gets knocked down by Mahesh's Tata Grande car driven by Preeti outside the drama hall in the early night hours. After he is hospitalised, Manohar learns from Jaywanti about Jairam's compressed vertebra due to a small accident in childhood.

Taking advantage of this, Manohar plans to extort ₹5,000,000 from Mahesh by faking Jairam's condition. Mahesh learns about Jairam's accident and decides to take the blame on himself to defend Preeti in the hit-and-run case. When Mahesh goes to the hospital, the completely unhurt Jairam (acting upon Manohar's instructions) pretends to be paralyzed from below his back as a result of the hit-and-run accident. However, Manohar's colleague Advocate Khamkar (Rajesh Chitnis) meets Mahesh and confides in him that Manohar is a fraud.

Manohar forces Mahesh to pay compensation as it is given that the cause of Jairam's accident is him but in vain. To expose Manohar's lie, Mahesh asks Jairam's examiner Dr. Gavande (Kshitij Zarapkar) to print a certificate that Jairam is perfectly fine. Despite this, his plan backfires as Manohar outsmarts him by scanning an X-ray of Jairam's compressed vertebra. However, Jaywanti discovers the truth after she spots Jairam dancing in his room while daydreaming of Preeti. Furious, she severes ties with Jairam and Manohar before leaving for her journey to the Ashtavinayak temples.

Meanwhile, Preeti reveals to Jairam that she is responsible for the accident. Jairam decides to tell her the truth about his illness as Manohar too leaks the news of his accident in the newspaper. That night, he escapes from the hospital and breaks into Mahesh's house but is unable to meet Preeti. To make matters worse, Mahesh spots Jairam in the house and attempts to get hold of him but in vain. Suspicious about Jairam, Mahesh asks Dr. Gavande to search for him in the hospital but till the time, Jairam had already entered his room and fallen asleep.

The next day, Mahesh visits Jairam in the hospital and challenges him to have arm wrestling with him. On Manohar's indication, Jairam deliberately loses in the game to show that he is not well. When Mahesh asks about Jairam's visit to his house the previous night, Manohar concocts another lie that the one who had come to Mahesh's house was Jairam's schizophrenic twin brother. As Mahesh laughs it off, he and Jairam are stunned after an exact lookalike of Jairam arrives at the hospital as the latter's twin brother.

Later that day, Manohar reveals to Jairam that he had approached actor Sachin Pilgaonkar the previous night and asked him to pose as his twin brother (as Preeti had mentioned during one of her visits that Jairam looks like Sachin). Soon, Jairam manages to meet Preeti as well and explains his and Manohar's plan to her. Still confused, the suspended Mahesh refuses to pay compensation to Manohar but comes across a report saying that Jairam's mother had given birth to twins.

This startles Manohar as well until Jairam tells him that he actually had a stillborn twin brother. Playing his next move, Mahesh captures Sachin and takes his team of experts to examine Jairam, who is busy with filming as "Sachin" in the meantime. However, Manohar abducts Sachin from Mahesh's house and has him pose as Jairam before Mahesh and the experts. After Jairam's arrival, Manohar creates a commotion that allows him to switch places with Sachin, resulting in the experts scanning an X-ray of his compressed vertebra before Mahesh.

In the end, Jairam and Manohar have seemingly succeeded in convincing Mahesh of Jairam's paralysis and expect much compensation from him. However, Preeti offers the money to Manohar alone and asks him to seek consent from Mahesh for her marriage with Jairam. Mahesh initially refuses due to Jairam's paralysis but his wife Meena (Bhagyashree Rane) suggests that Jairam and Preeti's marriage can end his suspension. On Manohar's idea, Mahesh arrives at the hospital and stages an "attempt to murder" of Preeti for motivating Jairam to recover.

As planned, Jairam rises up from his paralysis due to the "shock" and Mahesh eventually agrees for Jairam and Preeti's marriage. However, Meena asks Manohar to bring Jaywanti and Jairam's twin brother to the marriage ceremony as well. As another coincidence shows up, the three bump into an actress named "Basanti", who is an exact lookalike of Jaywanti. They immediately come up with a plan and decide to make Basanti pose as Jaywanti during the marriage ceremony.

On the day of Jairam and Preeti's marriage, Manohar summons Sachin to the ceremony for posing as Jairam's twin brother. Meanwhile, a third mysterious man looking exactly like Jairam arrives in India and secretly enters the marriage ceremony. When the time comes for the marriage to take place, Preeti, Mahesh and Manohar are shocked to see three lookalikes for Jairam stepping as the bridegroom. The first one is Jairam himself, the second one is Sachin, and the third one is Jairam's long-lost twin brother Gangaram who has come from the US.

At the same time, Basanti also reveals herself as Jairam and Gangaram's sister Jaywanti as she was already summoned to town by Dr. Gavande. The wedding priest reveals himself to be Dr. Gavande as well. Seeing no other way out, Jairam finally admits before Mahesh that he and Manohar took advantage of his compressed vertebra since childhood by staging the entire incident for money, and that they took help from Sachin to cover up their cheating. This angers Mahesh who refuses to give Preeti's hand in marriage to Jairam.

On Manohar's suggestion, Mahesh challenges Jairam to have arm wrestling with him again to test his capability. Mahesh, having realised his folly, deliberately loses in the game and allows Jairam to win, accepting him as his brother-in-law. The marriage of Jairam and Preeti successfully takes place, while Mahesh also helps Manohar by having him hired as a prosecuting attorney. The film ends with Jairam, Manohar, Mahesh, Preeti, Jaywanti and Meena happily celebrating their victory at a beach, satisfied that they are all united with each other and have gained success for good.

Cast 
The cast is listed below (according to the opening credits) -

 Sachin Pilgaonkar in a triple role as Jairam Gangavane / Himself / Gangaram Gangavane 
 Ashok Saraf as Advocate Manohar Barshinge
 Mahesh Kothare as Commissioner Mahesh Thakur 
 Bhargavi Chirmule as Preeti Thakur 
 Nirmiti Sawant as Jaywanti Barshinge / Basanti (fake) 
 Bhagyashree Rane as Meena Thakur (Mahesh's wife) 
 Kshitij Zarapkar as Dr. Gavande (Jairam's examiner) 
 Rajesh Chitnis as Advocate Khamkar (Manohar's colleague)
 Ali Asgar as Film Director (Special Appearance) 
 Swapnil Joshi as Preeti's co-dancer in "Aamhi Nahi Jaa" song (Special Appearance)

Soundtrack
The music is provided by Avadhoot Gupte and Sachin Pilgaonkar.<

Nihira Joshi has given female playback for the song 'Khulya jagachi reet' with Sachin Pilgaonkar.

Track listing

References

External links
 
 Ideachi Kalpana - A wonderful remake of Hollywood classic ‘Fortune cookie’! - afternoondc.in
 Movie Review - movies.burrp.com

2010 films
Films directed by Sachin (actor)
2010s Marathi-language films